Grand Bay National Wildlife Refuge was established in 1992 under the Emergency Wetlands Resources Act of 1986 to protect one of the largest expanses of undisturbed pine savanna habitats in the Gulf Coastal Plain region. The refuge is part of the National Wildlife Refuge system. The Refuge Complex Manager also administers the Mississippi Sandhill Crane National Wildlife Refuge and Bon Secour National Wildlife Refuge. Access to refuge lands (especially interior portions) is limited, but is available mostly on the Mississippi side and by boat.

Habitat

The habitat is varied and includes wet pine savannah, maritime forest, tidal flats, nontidal wetlands, salt pans, salt marshes, bays and bayous.

Research
Research projects include studying the ecological effects of rising sea levels, the ecology of vertebrates in tidal marshes, the ecology of the reserves habitats, monitoring the effects of mercury pollution, coastal plant ecology and mapping, and monitoring environmental conditions on a long-term basis.

Flora and fauna
The varied parts of the refuge provide suitable habitat for many migrant and resident species of bird. These include the scarlet tanager, the black-throated green warbler, the black-and-white warbler, the eastern towhee, the gray catbird, the painted bunting and the secretive white-eyed vireo.

Nine species of carnivorous plants including pitcher plants, butterworts and sundews are present in the reserve. These plants have modifications which enable them to catch insects which provides the nitrogen they need that is deficient in their swampy habitat.

References
Refuge profile
Refuge website

National Wildlife Refuges in Mississippi
National Wildlife Refuges in Alabama
Protected areas of Mobile County, Alabama
Protected areas of Jackson County, Mississippi
Wetlands of Alabama
Wetlands of Mississippi
Bays of Alabama
Gulf Coast of the United States
Landforms of Mobile County, Alabama
Landforms of Jackson County, Mississippi
Protected areas established in 1992
1992 establishments in Alabama
1992 establishments in Mississippi